Petar Golubović (born 13 July 1994) is a Serbian footballer who plays for Russian Premier League club Khimki.

Club career

Early career
Golubović, who from an early age was mentored by coach Aleksandar Janković, was a member of Red Star Belgrade's youth selections before he became a 2012 finalist in Nike Football Academy's "The Chance".

OFK Beograd
Golubović made his debut under coach Zoran Milinković at the age of 18 on April 3, 2013 in a 1-0 away win against Vojvodina.

Roma
On 31 January 2014, it was announced that Italian Serie A giants Roma completed the €1 million (and a variable fee up to a maximum of €0.5 million) signing of Golubović, who has agreed a four-and-a half year contract. He was loaned out to Serie B side Novara on loan for the remainder of the 2013–14 season. On 26 August 2014 he was signed by Pistoiese. On 17 July 2015 Golubović was signed by Pisa.

Khimki
On 9 February 2023, Golubović signed a 1.5-year contract with Russian Premier League club FC Khimki.

International career
Golubović played for the Serbia U19 side that won the 2013 UEFA European Under-19 Championship. He made his debut for Serbia U21 on 11 October 2013 in a 2-1 win against Cyprus U21.

References

External links
 
 
 
 

1994 births
Footballers from Belgrade
Living people
Serbian footballers
Association football defenders
Serbia youth international footballers
Serbia under-21 international footballers
Nike Academy players
OFK Beograd players
A.S. Roma players
Novara F.C. players
U.S. Pistoiese 1921 players
Pisa S.C. players
K.V. Kortrijk players
Aalesunds FK players
FC Khimki players
Serbian SuperLiga players
Serie B players
Serie C players
Belgian Pro League players
Eliteserien players
Russian Premier League players
Serbian expatriate footballers
Expatriate footballers in England
Serbian expatriate sportspeople in England
Expatriate footballers in Italy
Serbian expatriate sportspeople in Italy
Expatriate footballers in Belgium
Serbian expatriate sportspeople in Belgium
Expatriate footballers in Norway
Serbian expatriate sportspeople in Norway
Expatriate footballers in Russia
Serbian expatriate sportspeople in Russia